ABPA Backgammon is a backgammon video game for Intellivision (ABPA stands for American Backgammon Players Association). This was one of the original four launch titles for the Intellivision system.

Legacy
Backgammon is included is in the Intellivision Lives! game package for personal computers and game consoles.

References

1979 video games
Intellivision games
Intellivision-only games
Backgammon video games
North America-exclusive video games
Mattel video games
APh Technological Consulting games
Video games developed in the United States